The athletics competition at the 1985 Southeast Asian Games was held at the Suphachalasai Stadium, Bangkok, Thailand between December 11 to December 15.

Medal summary

Men

Women

Medal table

References
BASOC (1985) 13th SEA Games Official Report, Thailand
South East Asian Games. GBR Athletics. Retrieved on 2010-12-16.

1985 Southeast Asian Games
1985
SEA
International athletics competitions hosted by Thailand